The Battle of Cape Spartivento, known as the Battle of Cape Teulada in Italy, was a naval battle during the Battle of the Mediterranean in the Second World War, fought between naval forces of the Royal Navy and the Italian Regia Marina on 27 November 1940.

Origins
On the night of 11 November 1940, the British incapacitated or destroyed half of the Italian fleet's battleships in a daring aerial assault as they lay at rest at Taranto. Until then, the Italians had left their capital ships in harbour, hoping its mere presence as a fleet in being would deter British shipping through the area, though they would not decline battle if given the opportunity.

The British were warned of their approach and immediately turned about and returned to Gibraltar, launching their aircraft (two Blackburn Skuas and 12 Hawker Hurricanes) prematurely. One Skua and eight Hurricanes were lost at sea, as they ran out of fuel well before arriving at their destination, with the loss of seven airmen.

The Italians' success in disrupting the reinforcement of Malta cast serious doubt upon British plans to send a further convoy to supply the island (Operation Collar). However, the convoy was attempted, with increased support, including ships from Gibraltar-based Force H and Force D out of Alexandria. The convoy was spotted by the Italian intelligence service, and once again the Italian fleet sailed out to intercept it. The first Italian naval unit to make visual contact with the convoy was the torpedo boat  on the night of 26 November. After launching two torpedoes from long range, which missed their target, Sirio reported seven enemy warships heading to the east.

Battle
The British, aware of the Italian fleet's movements, sent their forces north to intercept them before they could come anywhere near the cargo ships.

Shortly after, at 9:56, admiral James Somerville received the report of his own aircraft from the carrier HMS Ark Royal about the presence of five cruisers and five destroyers, and assumed that these were Italian units closing for battle. Force D had not yet arrived from Alexandria and the British were outgunned, but 15 minutes later, Force D was spotted and the tables turned. The two forces were fairly even; although the Italian ships possessed both longer-ranged and larger guns, the British had an aircraft carrier, which had shown several advantages over the battleship at Taranto. However, the Italian admiral Inigo Campioni had been given orders to avoid combat unless it was heavily in his favour, so a decisive battle was out of the question.

Admiral Somerville deployed his forces into two main groups, with five cruisers under Rear Admiral Lancelot Holland in front and two battleships and seven destroyers in a second group following to the south. Meanwhile, and even further to the south, Ark Royal was preparing to launch its complement of Fairey Swordfish. The Italians had organized their fleet into three groups, two composed of the six heavy cruisers and seven of the destroyers and a third group of the two battleships and another seven escorting destroyers bringing up the rear. At 12:07, after a report received from the cruiser s floatplane, Campioni realized the closeness in strengths of the two forces and in accordance with his orders commanded the cruiser groups to re-form on the battleships and prepare to depart. However, by this point, the lead cruiser formation had already angled toward the British and was beginning to engage them in battle.

Rapid fire between the two forces continued as the distance between them closed, but as the range shortened Italian firepower began to put pressure on the outgunned British. The arrival of the battleship  on the British side helped to even the odds, but she was too slow to maintain formation and dropped out of battle after a few salvoes at 12:26. Four minutes later, Vice Admiral Angelo Iachino, commander of the Italian cruiser group, received orders to disengage, although the battle had swung slightly in their favour.

The heavy cruiser  was hit at 12:22 by a single 203 mm (8 in) shell, which knocked out her "Y" turret, killed seven men, wounded nine others and ignited a fire that took an hour to subdue. A second hit at 12:35 destroyed the after breaker (electrical switchboard) room and cut power to the ship's aft section, including the remaining aft turret.

At around 12:40, eleven Swordfish from Ark Royal attacked Vittorio Veneto with torpedoes, but did not score any hits.

For the next few minutes, the tables turned in favour of the British when the battlecruiser  closed the distance on the Italian cruisers, and straddled Trieste with two salvoes. The Italian cruiser was hit by splinters. Vittorio Veneto fired 19 rounds in seven salvoes from long range and that was enough for the now outgunned British cruisers, which turned back at the fourth salvo. In fact, as giant water-spouts erupted around Berwick and Manchester, Holland ordered smoke, and his ships fled southeast to close with Renown. Manchester was holed by splinters from Vittorio Veneto's rounds. Both forces withdrew, the battle lasting a total of 54 minutes and causing little damage to either side.

Aftermath
After the battle Winston Churchill wanted Somerville to be replaced, having questioned the admiral's offensive spirit ever since his objections to attacking the French at Mers-el-Kébir. However, a board of inquiry exonerated Somerville, who enjoyed the strong support of several fellow admirals. As for Campioni, although he had a mandate to be conservative, he had presided over the loss of Italy's best opportunity to deal the British a sharp setback in a fleet action. His days of command at sea were numbered. As Iachino remarked, "the use of these ships, which constituted at that moment nearly all of our fleet's effective units after the blow at Taranto, was decided by Supermarina mainly for reasons of morale, and to demonstrate that our combative spirit remained intact."

Popular culture
The battle features in the 1941 Italian film The White Ship directed by Roberto Rossellini.

Order of battle

Regia Marina

 Admiral Angelo Iachino
 Admiral Inigo Campioni
 2 battleships: , 

Royal Navy

 Admiral Sir James Somerville Force H (from Gibraltar)
 1 battlecruiser: 
 2 light cruisers: *,  (covered convoy)
 1 aircraft carrier:  (12 Fairey Fulmar fighters, 12 Blackburn Skua dive bombers, 30 Fairey Swordfish torpedo bombers)
 9 destroyers

 Admiral Andrew Cunningham Force D  (from Alexandria)
 1 battleship: 
 3 cruisers: *,  (covered convoy), *
 5 destroyers

 Admiral Lancelot Holland Force F (convoy escort)
 2 light cruisers: *, *
 1 destroyer:  

'*'Cruiser force detached under Holland:
1 heavy cruiser:  (damaged) and 4 light cruisers:  (slightly damaged), 

destroyers escorting Ark Royal during the battle: : , 

 Convoy

See also

Notes

References and external links
 Green, Jack & Massignani, Alessandro. The Naval War in the Mediterranean, 1940-1943, Chatham Publishing, London 1998. 
 O'Hara, Vincent P.: Struggle for the Middle Sea, Naval Institute Press, Annapolis, Maryland, 2009. .
 Shores, Cull and Malizia. Malta: The Hurricane Years (1940–41). Grub Street, London, 1999. 
 Stern, Robert C. (2015). Big Gun Battles: Warship Duels of the Second World War. Seaforth Publishing. .
 The Battle of Cape Teulada
 Battaglia di Capo Teulada - Plancia di Commando

Battle of the Mediterranean
Malta Convoys
1940 in Italy
Naval battles of World War II involving Italy
Cape Spartivento
November 1940 events